The Disneyland Resort line is a heavy rail MTR line connecting Sunny Bay to the Hong Kong Disneyland Resort, coloured pink on the network diagram. It is the seventh line of the former MTR network before the merger of MTR and KCR, and the world's first metro line designed to service a Disney theme park. There are only two stations on this line, Sunny Bay and Disneyland Resort, and the line operates as a shuttle service between these two stations. Sunny Bay station is an interchange station with the Tung Chung line between Tsing Yi and Tung Chung stations. Administratively, the entire line is in Tsuen Wan District, despite being situated on Lantau Island, and is the only MTR line in Hong Kong to run within a single district.

Construction
The rail link was constructed by Gammon Construction and completed in April 2005.

In preparation for the opening of Hong Kong Disneyland on 12 September, the line started operating on 1 August 2005. The rolling stock is distinctive on account of its Mickey Mouse windows, interior couch seating, and Disneyland figurines displayed in the carriages.

On 4 September 2005, the Disneyland Resort line served nearly 40,000 passengers. Peak patronage occurs around 08:00-10:00 and 21:00–23:00 hours, at the parks' respective opening and closing times.

Train design
The Disneyland Resort line is 3.5 kilometres long, and has a travel time of around 6 minutes. The MTR designed a new driverless train and produced it by refitting existing M-Trains for the line which is designed with a Disney theme in mind. Bronze statues of well-known Disney characters, such as Mickey Mouse and Donald Duck, are included inside of the trains, and the windows are shaped like Mickey Mouse's head, instead of the rounded rectangles found on trains of other lines.

All of the trains used on the Disneyland Resort line were originally ordered from 1994-1998 as subtype H-Stock train (Phase 3 EMU, A/C 270-291, B/C 486-496). MTR contracted Alstom for these trains, but they were made in England, much like the Phase 1 and 2 trains ordered from 1979–1989 and made by Metro-Cammell (also in England), which was acquired by GEC Alsthom (now Alstom) in 1989. Units A/C274 A/C281 A/C284 A/C289 A/C291 and B/C490 are now used on the Disneyland Resort line; they were refurbished in 2005 by United Goninan, the same company that modernized the Urban Line trains from 1998-2001.

These trains are the first on the MTR to use automatic train operation during normal operation, followed by the CNR Changchun EMUs in service on the South Island line. However, unlike the South Island line, the operator's cab area has been retained, visible through glass windows at each end of the train.

Stations
This is a list of the stations on the Disneyland Resort line.

List

Disneyland Resort station was designed in Victorian architecture, while Sunny Bay was designed to be modern. This contrast in design was done to make passengers feel like they are travelling through time between the fantasy world of the Disneyland Resort and the rest of the city.

See also

Rail transport in Walt Disney Parks and Resorts

References

External links

Environmental reports of the Disneyland Resort Line (Penny's Bay Rail Link) Project 
Disneyland Resort Line project website 
A brochure of the Penny's Bay Rail Link project  (Adobe Systems Acrobat (pdf) format)
HKDL Source - The Premiere Hong Kong Disneyland Fansite - MTR Page

 
1432 mm gauge railways in Hong Kong
Hong Kong Disneyland Resort
MTR lines
Rail transport in Walt Disney Parks and Resorts
Railway lines opened in 2005
Railways of amusement parks in Hong Kong
2005 establishments in Hong Kong